Dschinghis Khan ("Genghis Khan") was a German Eurodisco pop band. It was originally formed in Munich in 1979 to compete in the Eurovision Song Contest with their song "Dschinghis Khan". The original group led by original members Henriette Strobel and Edina Pop ended in 2020 after the death of fellow member Johannes Kupreit, while a more current version of the group led by original member Wolfgang Heichel and Stefan Track (who replaced the deceased Louis Potgieter in the 2005 reunion concert) has been active since 2018.

History

Beginning: 1979–1985
Dschinghis Khan was managed by German producer Ralph Siegel and choreographed by Hannes Winkler, one of the most famous German choreographers during that time.   Their original eponymous song was written and produced by Siegel with lyrics by Bernd Meinunger and came in fourth place at the Eurovision Song Contest 1979 in Jerusalem. Their name is a possible German spelling (most usual is "Dschingis Khan") of the name of the historical figure Genghis Khan of the Mongol Empire. The only native Germans in the group were the bald-headed Karl-Heinz "Steve" Bender and Wolfgang Heichel, who brought his Dutch-born wife Henriette ( Strobel) with him. Louis Hendrik Potgieter (Genghis Khan) was South African. Edina Pop (Marika Késmárky) was a Hungarian who had started her singing career in West Germany in 1969. Leslie Mándoki, also Hungarian, had left Hungary in 1975.

In 1979, the group released the singles "Dschinghis Khan" and "Moskau". A year later, the English version of "Moskau" topped the charts in Australia for six weeks, largely thanks to Seven Network using the song as the theme music for coverage of the 1980 Summer Olympics. In an interview with Russian television presenter Alexandra Glotova, the producer of the group Dschinghis Khan, Heinz Gross, said that in the 1980s, the group was banned in the Soviet Union and was accused of anti-communism and nationalism.

Following the success of the singles "Hadschi Halef Omar", "Rom", "Pistolero", and "Loreley", Dschinghis Khan underwent an image change, with their songs becoming more folk-oriented with their fourth album, Helden, Schurken & der Dudelmoser. As a result, their popularity waned. The group released their fifth album, Corrida, which served as the soundtrack to the musical of the same name by Siegel and Meinunger. After the release of the single "Mexico", Dschinghis Khan disbanded in 1985.

Post-disbandment: 1985–2005

Following Dschinghis Khan's disbandment, the members took different paths. Mándoki became a successful musician and producer while Pop pursued a solo singing career and Bender worked as a music producer. The success of the band eventually led to Wolfgang and Henriette's divorce in 1986, with Henriette reverting to her maiden name of Strobel.

In 1986, the group reunited as "Dschinghis Khan Family", but only with original members Strobel on vocals, Mándoki on drums, and Potgieter on keyboards. The song "Wir gehör'n zusammen" led them to a national qualifying round of the Eurovision Song Contest, where they finished in second place.

In 1994, Potgieter died of AIDS in South Africa.

Reunion: 2005–2018
On 17 December 2005, Dschinghis Khan reunited at the Retro FM Festival in Moscow, with founding members Bender, Pop, Heichel, and Strobel joined by new members Stefan Track, Kaya Ebru, and Daniel Käsling. In May 2006, Bender died of cancer. The song "Wie Feuer im Wind" on the group's 2007 album 7 Leben was dedicated to both Potgieter and Bender.

In 2006, Track left the group and started his own solo project called Rocking Son. On July 15, Strobel, Heichel, and Pop were joined by the dance group The Legacy of Dschinghis Khan in a concert in Mongolia. The dance group consisted of Claus Kupreit, Corinna Günzel, Benjamin Schobel, Evi Weigand, Stefan Sauter, and Angelika Nimbach; Kurpreit would go on to become a permanent member of Dschinghis Khan. In 2014, Heichel left the group due to creative differences.

Recent developments: 2018–present
In 2018, Dschinghis Khan re-recorded "Moskau" with new lyrics for the 2018 FIFA World Cup, which was hosted in Russia. For the German and English versions, the lead vocals were performed by former US5 member Jay Khan. Alexander Malinin and his daughter Ustinya performed the Russian version, titled "Moskva". The Spanish version, titled "Moscú", was performed by Jorge Jiménez and Marifer Medrano. At the same time, Heichel teamed up with Track to record the song "We Love Football". It was revealed that Heichel gained the rights to the Dschinghis Khan name in Germany and Spain. Strobel, Pop, Kupreit, and producer Heinz Gross also own the rights to the name Dschinghis Khan, with both group patents revealing the use of their own logos. As a result, there are two disco groups operating under the name Dschinghis Khan.

On 12 September 2020, dancer and singer Johannes Kupreit died in a car accident in Germany. Tributes were paid from the members and Dschinghis Khan fans from around the world. By the end of 2020, Pop and Strobel retired from their band. Meanwhile, the Heichel and Track faction of Dschinghis Khan released the studio album Here We Go, which is a mix of new songs and self-covers.

In July 2021, Siegel sued Heichel when the latter attempted to bar him from releasing the 2018 FIFA World Cup version of "Moskau" and claimed to have full ownership of the Dschinghis Khan name. The Munich Regional Court ruled in favor of Siegel and awarded him the trademark rights to the group, citing him as the group's original creator and producer and the group's prior disbandments did not affect his ownership rights.

Dschinghis Khan is still performing now and the Pop/Heichel version is reuniting in 2023. According to Dschinghis Khan Management, Wolfgang has left the group he started with Stefan Track and started yet another Dschinghis Khan called "Dschinghis Khan FEAT. ORIGINAL WOLFGANG HEICHEL" with a completely new line up. Despite this, Stefan Track continues to tour with his version of Dschinghis Khan and will be performing in England for the first time in May 2023 and performed a duet of Rasputin with Boney M. Feat Liz Mitchell in September 2022.

Members 
Original lineup
 Louis Hendrik Potgieter (1979–1985; died 1994)
 Edina Pop (1979–1985, 2005–2020)
 Henriette Strobel (1979–1985, 2005–2020)
 Wolfgang Heichel (1979–1985, 2005–2014)
 Leslie Mándoki (1979–1985)
 Steve Bender  (1979–1981, 2005–2006; died 2006)

Other members
 Stefan Track (as Genghis Khan) (2005–2007)
 Daniel Käsling (as Ögödei Khan) (2005–2007)
 Kaya Ebru (as Eltuya Khan) (2005–2007)
 Claus Kupreit (as Prince Igei Khan) (2007–2020)
 Corinna Günzel (as Eltuya Khan) (2007–2014)
 Evi Weigand (as Ohla Khan) (2007–2014)
 Attila Mario Diallo (as Cash Khan) (2007–2014)
 Benjamin Schobel (as Ögödei Khan) (2007–2011)
 Stefan Sauter (as Yassa Khan) (2007–2009)
 Angelika Nimbach (as Yesugan Khan) (2007–2008)
 Johannes Kupreit (as Ögödei Khan) (2011–2020; died 2020)
 Läm Virat Phetnoi (as Yassa Khan) (2012–2020)
 Angelika Erlacher (as Eltuya Khan) (2016–2020)
 Jan Großfeld (as Bärke Khan) (2019–2020)

Timeline

Discography

Dschinghis Khan (1979)
Rom (1980)
Viva (1980)
Wir sitzen alle im selben Boot (1981)
Helden, Schurken & der Dudelmoser (1982)
Corrida (1983)
7 Leben (2007)

References

External links
 (Henriette Strobel and Edina Pop lineup)
 (Wolfgang Heichel and Stefan Track lineup)

Internet memes
Eurovision Song Contest entrants for Germany
German musical groups
Eurodisco groups
Eurovision Song Contest entrants of 1979
Genghis Khan
20th-century German musicians
Musical groups established in 1979
1979 establishments in West Germany